Exon may refer to:
Exon, a region of DNA that is represented in the mature form of RNA
Exoribonuclease or ExoN, an RNA degrading enzyme
Exoniensis or Exon., the Post-Nominal Letters for alumni / degrees from the University of Exeter
Exon can also refer to the signature of the Bishop of Exeter
J. James Exon (1921–2005), American politician
Nat Exon (born 1992), Australian rules footballer
Exon is a rank for an officer in the Yeomen of the Guard

It may also be a spelling error for:
ExxonMobil, the energy company
Exxon, a brand of fuel sold by ExxonMobil